Itak may refer to:

Bolo knife, a large cutting tool called an itak in Tagalog
Illankai Tamil Arasu Kachchi (ITAK), a Sri Lankan political party which represents the Sri Lankan Tamil ethnic minority